Pleiotrophin (PTN) also known as heparin-binding brain mitogen (HBBM) or heparin-binding growth factor 8 (HBGF-8) or neurite growth-promoting factor 1 (NEGF1) or heparin affinity regulatory peptide (HARP) or heparin binding growth associated molecule (HB-GAM) is a protein that in humans is encoded by the PTN gene. Pleiotrophin is an 18-kDa growth factor that has a high affinity for heparin. It is structurally related to midkine and retinoic acid induced heparin-binding protein.

Function 

Pleiotrophin was initially recognized as a neurite outgrowth-promoting factor present in rat brain around birth and as a mitogen toward fibroblasts isolated from bovine uterus tissue. Together with midkine these growth-factors constitute a family of (developmentally regulated) secreted heparin-binding proteins now known as the neurite growth-promoting factor (NEGF) family.  During embryonic and early postnatal development, pleiotrophin is expressed in the central and peripheral nervous system and also in several non-neural tissues, notably lung, kidney, gut and bone.  Pleiotrophin is also expressed by several tumor cells and is thought to be involved in tumor angiogenesis. In the adult central nervous system, pleiotrophin is expressed in an activity-dependent manner in the hippocampus where it can suppress long term potentiation induction. Pleiotrophin expression is low in other areas of the adult brain, but it can be induced by ischemic insults. or targeted neuronal damaged in the entorhinal cortex or in the substantia nigra pars compacta.

Clinical significance 

Pleiotrophin binds to cell-surface nucleolin as a low affinity receptor. This binding can inhibit HIV infection.

References

Further reading

Growth factors

de:Wachstumsfaktor
es:Factor de crecimiento
fr:Facteur de croissance